Cam Beck is a stream in Cumbria. It runs for  past Kirkambeck and Cambeck Hill and into the River Irthing.

Toponymy
From the British cambaco meaning "crooked stream"''.

References

Rivers of Cumbria
Geography of Cumbria